The Citra Award for Best Actress is an award given at the Indonesian Film Festival (FFI) to Indonesian actresses for their achievements in leading roles. The Citra Awards, described by Screen International as "Indonesia's equivalent to the Oscars", are the country's most prestigious film awards and are intended to recognize achievements in films as well as to draw public interest to the film industry.

Ladya Cheryl is the most recent winner for her performance in Vengeance Is Mine, All Others Pay Cash the 2022 ceremony, after previously losing to Fahrani in 2008.

History 
The Citra Awards, then known as the Indonesian Film Festival Awards, were first given in 1955 to two winners without a nomination process: Dhalia (Lewat Djam Malam) and Fifi Young (Tarmina). The two-way tie, also found in the Best Film and Best Actor categories, was controversial as film critics considered Lewat Djam Malam the superior film, leading to allegations that Djamaluddin Malik had bought Tarmina prize. Succeeding festivals were held in 1960 and 1967 and annually since 1973.

There were no Citra Awards given between 1993 and 2003 due to sharp decline in domestic film production. It was reinstated as an annual event in 2004 after receiving funds from the Indonesian government.

Christine Hakim is the most decorated actress with 6 awards out of 10 nominations in this category. She has also received 3 additional awards out of 4 nominations in the Best Supporting Actress category, bringing her overall total to 9 awards out of 14 nominations. Meriam Bellina has won twice out of 6 nominations, whereas Lydia Kandou and Yenny Rachman each won 2 of their 5 nominations. Atiqah Hasiholan has received the most nominations without winning any with four, followed by Jajang C. Noer, Nurul Arifin, Paramitha Rusady, and Zoraya Perucha with three nominations without any wins. However, Noer has two wins as a supporting actress for Mer's Lips in 1992 and Cinta tapi Beda in 2013.

Two actresses from the same film have been nominated for Best Actress in the same year: Pasir Berbisik and Eliana, Eliana in 2001, Virgin in 2005, as well as Mengejar Mas-Mas in 2007. Of these, only Dinna Olivia (Mengejar Mas-Mas) managed to win.

Nominations and awards

 

Winners are highlighted in blue and listed in bold.

1950s

1960s

1970s

1980s

1990s

2000s

2010s

2020s

Multiple wins and nominations

Explanatory notes

See also
 Cinema of Indonesia
 Indonesian Film Festival
 Citra Award for Best Picture
 Citra Award for Best Director
 Citra Award for Best Actor
 Citra Award for Best Supporting Actor
 Citra Award for Best Supporting Actress
 Maya Awards

References



Citra Awards
Film awards for lead actress